Myeongjang Station is an underground station of Busan Metro Line 4 in Allak-dong, Dongnae District, Busan, South Korea.

Station Layout

Vicinity
 Exit 1: Chaoyang A
 Exit 2: Baskin-Robbins
 Exit 3: Chaoyang A
 Exit 4: Pork Soup

External links
  Cyber station information from Busan Transportation Corporation

Busan Metro stations
Dongnae District
Railway stations opened in 2011